Love Me India is a live singing reality show that broadcasts on & TV. It is the first live singing reality show for kids in India, between the ages of 5 and 15.
The show was hosted by Meiyang Chang and cameo hosted by Sunanda Wong (for auditions period only). Guru Kiran Hegde won the first season with 191 live Heartbeats from South Zone, Bangalore, Karnataka

Captains

Judged by Guru Randhawa, Himesh Reshammiya and Neha Bhasin. There are four more judges in the show (called 'captain' in the show). It introduced captains across the four zones — Anusha Mani (South), Bhoomi Trivedi (East), Navraj Hans (North) and Abhijeet Sawant (West).

Top 4 Finalist
Denotes Winner in bold

Contestant 

Donates Winner in bold

Live voting
Audience can vote for any contestant through ZEE5.

References

Hindi-language television shows
2018 Indian television series debuts
Indian reality television series